Teddy is a 2021 Indian Tamil-language fantasy action film written and directed by Shakti Soundar Rajan. The film stars a teddy bear in the titular role as a special character, while Arya along with Sayyeshaa feature in the lead roles. Remade in telugu as buddy.Sathish, Karunakaran and Magizh Thirumeni play supporting roles in the film The music is composed by D. Imman and film is produced by K. E. Gnanavel Raja under his production banner Studio Green. 

It is the first Tamil film to use an Indian animation company to design a special animated character and the second motion-capture film in Tamil after Kochadaiiyaan (2014). The film was released worldwide on 12 March 2021 via Hotstar and received generally mixed reviews from critics.

Plot 
 
Srividya Purushottaman alias Sri is a college student, who helps a person faced an accident, in return for having her hand injured. She is sent to a hospital where she is given IV drugged to cause an artificially induced coma. Sri awakens and is given the medicine, where her soul gets transferred to a Teddy bear. Shivanarayanan aka Shiva is an unemployed graduate, who is having an eidetic memory and OCD which makes him learn things faster. After his mother, Lakshmi and his friend take him to meet Dr. Priya Gopal, who is a psychiatrist for a session, but to no avail. 

One night, Shiva saves a teenager from goons where Sri (whose soul is in the teddy bear) witness the fight and meets him in the morning. Shiva first believes to be a dream, but soon understands that it's real. Sri tells Shiva that she needs to see her boyfriend Rishi, where Sri and Shiva realize that Rishi is a fraud and Sri gets heart broken. After Shiva and his friend Ramachandran take Srividya to her house, he sees Sri's father Purushottaman trying to commit suicide, Shiva saves him and her mother requests them to find her. Shiva promises to find Srividya. Shiva and Sri investigates to find her body, that was transferred from the hospital. Shiva sends Sri as a package with a barcode from the hospital and also gives her a smartphone to track the location where the parcel would be sent. 

The parcel reaches the destination, which turns to be Azerbaijan where Sri uses a phone of a beggar and takes a selfie in front of a restaurant and send it to Shiva through Facebook. Shiva sells all the shares for expenses and travels to Azerbaijan. While traveling, He meets Karthik, who had been working in Azerbaijan for three years. Shiva and Sri unite and makes Karthik to believe the story divulged by Shiva. They decided to search for Sri's body in one of the brothel in the place. Sri found the same tattoo that she saw in the hands of the parcel deliverer. Deducing the clues given by the person, Shiva realized about the huge medical scam and deduced that they had kidnapped Sri for her rare-blood type live-organs which is used to cure billionaires. 

The mastermind behind the scam is Dr. Varadharajan, who runs an illegal organ scam and also injected many people to cause induced coma and taking away their wanted live-organs in their secret hospital in countryside. Shiva and Sri seek the help of the police where they legally solve the case. Sri becomes conscious, while the soul in the Teddy leaves. Sri can't remember Shiva and his hard effort made to save her. They arrive back to India and Sri reunites with her parents. One year later, Sri starts following Shiva and takes pictures of him, as she developed unconditional feelings for him. Shiva reciprocates his feelings, where they get married and lead a happy life. Shiva realizes that when Sri falls asleep, her soul gets transferred back to the Teddy.

Cast 
 Arya as Shivanarayanan aka Shiva
 Sayyeshaa as Srividya Purushottaman (Sri)
 Nimmi Harshan (voice) & E.B. Gokulan (motion capture) as Teddy
 Sakshi Agarwal as Dr. Priya Gopal (Guest Appearance)
 Magizh Thirumeni as Dr. Varadarajan
 Sathish as Ramachandran, Shiva's friend
 Karunakaran as Karthik
 Raja Rudrakodi as Rishi - Srividya's Boyfriend
 Masoom Shankar as Sarah
 R. N. R. Manohar as Purushottaman, Srividya's father
 Mona Bedre as Srividya's mother
 Praveena as Lakshmi, Shiva's mother
 Abdool Lee as Varadharajan's assistant
 Shabeer Kallarakkal as Harish
 Pradeep K Vijayan 
Yoann Periver as Rabbids

Production 
The film was announced by director Shakti Soundar Rajan in March 2019 which also marked his fifth directorial venture and maiden collaboration with actor Arya. The principal photography of the film commenced in May 2019.  Sakshi Agarwal was approached to play a supporting role after participating in the reality TV show Bigg Boss Tamil 3.

Director Magizh Thirumeni who was known for his directorial Thadam was cast to play a supporting role which also marked his acting debut. The theme of the film revolves around the special character Teddy Bear in animation which would appear for nearly 80 minutes of the film. The film was predominantly shot in Chennai and in a few locations across Europe.

The shooting portion of the film was wrapped up in February 2020. In June 2020, Thirumeni confirmed the film would proceed with a theatrical release, despite rumours that they were exploring an over-the-top media service release.

Soundtrack 

The soundtrack of the film is composed by D. Imman, continuing his collaboration with the director for the third time after Miruthan (2016) and Tik Tik Tik (2018). The lyrics are written by Madhan Karky. The first single En Iniya Thanimaye which was sung by Sid Sriram was released on 14 February 2020 coinciding with the Valentine's Day. Later the video song of "En Iniya Thanimaye" was released on 1 March 2021.

Release 
Teddy was scheduled to release on 24 April 2020, but was postponed due to the COVID-19 pandemic in India. The film was released worldwide via Hotstar on 12 March 2021.

Baradwaj Rangan of Film Companion South wrote, "Tamil cinema's high-concept king, Shakti Soundar Rajan, takes a tumble with this story about a giant talking bear."

References

External links 
 

Films scored by D. Imman
Films shot in Chennai
Films shot in Europe
Films shot in Tamil Nadu
Films using motion capture
Indian films with live action and animation
Fictional teddy bears
Disney+ Hotstar original films
2020s fantasy action films
Indian fantasy action films
Films about obsessive–compulsive disorder
2020s Tamil-language films
Films about bears